Hostage of Time is a film from Lebanon by Jean K. Chamoun (1994, 50 min).

The narrative focuses on the experiences of a young female doctor who
returns to her village in south Lebanon to find the area affected by an Israeli assault which destroyed 50 villages and displaced half a million people.

Following her work with the women and children of the surrounding villages, the film charts the hopes and dreams of the people of Southern Lebanon and their efforts to rebuild their lives.

1994 films
1994 drama films
Lebanese drama films